Sompop Jantraka is a Thai activist who has spent over twenty-three years rescuing children from exploitative labour or child trafficking.

In 1988, after earning his bachelor's degree in political science from Chiang Mai University, Sompop became a researcher for the International Labour Organization and worked with a journalist investigating trafficking in Thailand.

Development and Education Programme for Daughters and Communities 
In 1989, Sompop founded the Daughters Education Programme (DEP) to prevent vulnerable girls from being forced into the sex industry by funding their education. Working with a network of volunteers in villages in northern Thailand, DEP intervenes with girls and their families before they are sold to brothel owners, providing them with free vocational education so they can be self-reliant and economically independent.

In 1992, DEP became a part of a larger umbrella organization, Development and Education Programme for Daughters and Communities (DEPDC). DEPDC operates an emergency shelter for abused or abandoned children, and for girls who have left prostitution. DEPDC also offers education programs and human rights training for indigenous people and undocumented migrants.

Mekong Youth Net 
Sompop resigned as director of DEPDC in 2007 to focus on anti-trafficking programmes throughout the Greater Mekong sub-region, including Laos, Vietnam, Burma, Cambodia, and Yunnan Province in China. Through the Mekong Youth Net, grassroots youth leaders have been brought together to provide relief and solutions to the exploitation of girls among the hill tribes and minority communities of the region.

Honors and awards 
 Ashoka Fellow (1994)
 Time/Asia Hero of the Year (2002)
 In March 2008, Sompop Jantraka was awarded the Wallenberg Medal by the University of Michigan.

References 

 Development and Education Programme for Daughters and Communities Centre in the Greater Mekong Subregion
 Development and Education Programme for Daughters and Communities
 Time/Asia, Asian Heroes

Living people
Sompop Jantraka
1957 births
Sompop Jantraka
Ashoka Fellows